Kohzad is a surname. Notable people with the surname include:

 Ahmed Ali Kohzad (born 1979), Pakistani politician
 Mohammad Hasan Kohzad, member of 4th committee to review Constitutional Loya Jirga
 Youssof Kohzad (born 1935), Afghan writer, painter, playwright, artist, poet, actor, and art consultant
 Zakia Kohzad (born circa 1950), former TV news anchor